Batkor is a small village located on the top a foothill near Jalaalabad, in Gilgit district of Gilgit-Baltistan, in northern Pakistan. In the sectarian violence of 1988, Batkor village was also burnt down.

Places nearby
Bagrot Valley
Sectarian violence in Pakistan (1988)

References 

Populated places in Gilgit District
Villages in Pakistan